St. Vartan Park is a  public park in the Murray Hill neighborhood of Manhattan, New York City. Located on the block bounded by First Avenue, Second Avenue, and 35th and 36th streets, the park is named after the nearby St. Vartan Armenian Cathedral. St. Vartan Park includes basketball and handball courts, a turf athletic field, a playground, and a garden.

History
The land for the park was obtained by the city through condemnation in 1903. The park was constructed from 1904 to 1905 and was originally named St. Gabriel's Park after the former St. Gabriel Church located at 310 East 37th Street.

In 1938, a portion of the park was removed to make way for an approach roadway leading to the Queens–Midtown Tunnel, which was completed in 1940. New parkland was added in the vicinity of 42nd Street to offset this land taking, which resulted in the creation of Robert Moses Playground. Construction of the Manhattan portal of the Queens–Midtown Tunnel also resulted in the elimination of St. Gabriel Church, the original namesake for the park.

St. Gabriel's Park was renamed St. Vartan Park in 1978.

The park’s asphalt playground was replaced by a synthetic turf field in 2021 to improve existing parks due to the temporary loss of park space during construction of the city's East Side Coastal Resiliency project.

In April 2022, the St. Vartan Park Conservancy was formed as a not-for-profit organization. A public event to celebrate the opening of the St. Vartan Park garden to the general public after years of closure was held in the garden on May 9, 2022. Remarks were delivered at the event by elected officials, community advocates, St. Vartan Park Conservancy officers and others including from the New York City Department of Parks and Recreation and a local public elementary school.

References

External links
 St. Vartan Park – NYC Department of Parks and Recreation
 St. Vartan Park Conservancy

Parks in Manhattan
Murray Hill, Manhattan